Belfair is a census-designated place in Mason County, Washington, United States.  Located at the mouth of the Union River at Hood Canal, it serves as the commercial center of North Mason County. The population of the surrounding area grows in the summertime, as the Canal and the Olympic Peninsula are popular with tourists. The population was 3,931 as of the 2010 census.

History
Belfair was originally referred to as Clifton, as were several other towns in the state. To avoid confusion, it was renamed in 1925 by Mrs. Murray, then postmaster, who submitted the name Belfair from a book that she was then reading.

Geography
Belfair is located on an isthmus connecting the Kitsap and Olympic Peninsula. It receives an average rainfall of  yearly and has a growing season of 212 days with final spring frost around April 20 usually.

Parks and recreation
Belfair serves as a gateway town for the Hood Canal region, and is the last town with services before visitors reach Tahuya State Forest.

The Theler Wetlands have walking trails meandering through  of tidal wetlands, offering boardwalks and well-groomed paths with views of Hood Canal, Union River, and a tidal estuary. Other nature trails can be found near Belfair Elementary.

Arts and culture
Belfair is home to "The Taste of Hood Canal", an annual event falling on the second Saturday in August. This festival features local artists, foods, a classic car show and is sponsored by the North Mason Rotary Club.

Belfair is also home to the Mary E. Theler Community Center.

Infrastructure

Health care

Belfair is the regional service hub for North Mason County. Harrison Hospital operates an urgent care facility in Belfair, and local doctor offices are in the area along with other professional services. The area has local and chain restaurants, along with two major grocery stores. Local shopping includes gift stores. Timberland Regional Library has a local branch in Belfair. Several public golf courses are nearby, including McCormick Woods, Gold Mountain, Alderbrook, Trophy Lake, Horseshoe Lake, and Lakeland Village.

Roads

Washington State Route 3 is the main road leading into Belfair, from Bremerton and Gorst in the north, and Allyn in the south. Washington State Route 106 also starts at the south end of Belfair, leading toward Union, the next town along the south shore of Hood Canal. Washington State Route 300 begins in Belfair and runs along the north shore of Hood Canal, providing access to Tahuya and Dewatto Bay.

Education
Belfair has two high schools (North Mason High School and James A. Taylor High School, an alternative school), a middle school (Hawkins Middle School), two elementary schools (Sand Hill Elementary and Belfair Elementary), and a co-op preschool.

Notable people

 Noah Ashenhurst, former English teacher at North Mason High School and award-winning author of the novel Comfort Food
 Norm Dicks, politician and former member of the United States House of Representatives
 Daniel Lane, children's book illustrator
 Jason Raines, 6 time American Motorcyclist Association (AMA) National Champion

References

External links

Mason County Government
Map of Area
North Mason Chamber
Belfair Farmers Market
Official Tourism Web Site for Mason County

Census-designated places in Mason County, Washington
Census-designated places in Washington (state)